Abomination is an English term used to translate the Biblical Hebrew terms shiqquts  and  , which are derived from , or the terms ,  or  (noun) or  (verb). An abomination in English is that which is exceptionally loathsome, hateful, sinful, wicked, or vile.

The term  is translated abomination by almost all translations of the Bible.

The common but slightly different Hebrew term, is also translated as abomination in the Authorized King James Version, and sometimes in the New American Standard Bible. Many modern versions of the Bible (including the New International Version and New English Translation) translate it detestable; the New American Bible translates it loathsome. It is mainly used to denote idolatry; and in many other cases it refers to inherently evil things such as illicit sex, lying, murder, deceit, etc.; and for unclean foods.



Analysis of the term

Shiqquts
Shiqquts is used in the following ways:

Jerome, and most of the Christian fathers, suppose that the reference is to Antiochus as the type of Antichrist, and that the description passes from the type to the antitype. Idolatry is presented as the chief sin in the Bible, and shiqquts is often used to describe such.
 In his campaign of Hellenization, Antiochus caused an altar to be erected on the altar for burnt-offerings of the Second Temple, on which pig sacrifices were offered to Zeus Olympios. (Comp. 1 Maccabees 1:54).

sinful sacrifices
idolatry
witchcraft

The word  is used with reference to:
seafood that lacks fins and scales
all insects except for locust, crickets and grasshoppers
eagles, ossifrage, and the osprey
other biblically unclean animals or touching certain things,()
Consequently, these animals were unclean and therefore eating them was forbidden.

 is rendered in the KJV as follows:

abominable
abomination
abhorred
detest

Tōʻēḇā
Tōʻēḇā is used in the following ways:

Every shepherd was "an abomination" unto the Egyptians.
Pharaoh was so moved by the fourth plague, that while he refused the demand of Moses, he offered a compromise, granting to the Israelites permission to hold their festival and offer their sacrifices in Egypt. This permission could not be accepted, because Moses said they would have to sacrifice "the abomination of the Egyptians".
 lists seven things which are also abominations: "haughty eyes, a lying tongue, hands that shed innocent blood, a heart that devises wicked schemes, feet that are swift in running to mischief, a false witness who utters lies, and one who spreads strife among brothers."

Tōʻēḇā is also used in Jewish (and Christian Old Testament) scriptures to refer to:

idolatry or idols
illicit sex (e.g. prostitution, adultery, incest)
illicit marriage
a man "lying with a man as with a woman" (see Homosexuality in the Hebrew Bible)
temple prostitution
offerings from the above
child sacrifice to Molech
cross-dressing
cheating in the market by using rigged weights
dishonesty
pride
unclean animals
stealing, murder, and adultery, breaking covenants
 usury, violent robbery, murder, oppressing the poor and needy, etc.

Tâ‛ab is rendered the following ways in the KJV

abhor, 9 Deu 7:26, Deu 23:7 (2), Job 9:31, Job 30:10, Psa 5:6, Psa 119:163, Amo 5:10, Mic 3:9;
abominable, 6 1Ch 21:6, Job 15:16, Psa 53:1 (2), Isa 14:19, Eze 16:52;
abhorred, 3 Job 19:19, Psa 106:40, Eze 16:25;
abhorreth, 2 Psa 107:18, Isa 49:7;
abominably, 1 1Ki 21:26;
committed, 1 Eze 16:52.

See also
 The Bible and homosexuality
 Damnation
 Fire and brimstone
 Gehinnom
 Hell
 Leviticus 18
 Religion and homosexuality
 Shiksa and shegetz, Yiddish slang words deriving from 
 Tophet
 Total depravity
 Abomination (Judaism)

References

External links

bibletab.com/a/abomination.htm Bible concordance for the term
http://www.paidionbooks.org/girrard/studies/abomnatn.htm#42

Hebrew Bible words and phrases
Religious terminology